Richard Schuh (2 October 1920 – 18 February 1949) was a German convicted murderer and the last criminal to be executed by the West German judiciary (excluding West Berlin).

Biography 
Schuh was a trained mechanic who had served in the Luftwaffe during World War II. He was later detained by the Americans as a POW. After his release, he made a living by doing odd jobs. Since he was only able to make a living with difficulty in this way, he murdered Hans Eugen Roth, a truck driver, near Herrenberg on 28 January 1948, in order to get hold of the new tires on his vehicle and sell them on the black market.

Schuh's crime was quickly solved. He was arrested, convicted of murder and aggravated robbery, and sentenced to death by the Tübingen Regional Court in May 1948. Schuh's mother killed herself shortly after her son's arrest. Schuh's appeal, as well as pleas for clemency from close relatives and even from the director of the prison where Schuh was incarcerated, were ineffective: a commutation of the sentence to life imprisonment was in the hands of the President of Württemberg-Hohenzollern, Gebhard Müller, a proponent of capital punishment. Müller declined to intervene.

The execution was carried out with a guillotine on 18 February 1949, at six o'clock in the morning, in the courtyard of the prison at 18 Doblerstraße in Tübingen. During the execution, the small town hall bell was rung. Schuh himself had only learned of the scheduled date the night before. Schuh's body was handed over to the anatomical institute of the University of Tübingen. The guillotine is on display in the Ludwigsburg Prison Museum.

Legacy 
During the Nazi era, some 16,000 people had been executed. In the years between the end of the war and the entry into force of the Basic Law on 24 May 1949, German courts in the three western occupation zones imposed a total of 34 death sentences; 15 of these were carried out. Schuh's beheading was the last civilian execution on West German territory.

In West Berlin, where the Basic Law applied only to a limited extent, capital punishment for civilian crimes was not abolished until 1951; the last person to be executed there was the robber-murderer Berthold Wehmeyer on 11 May 1949. In abolishing capital punishment, the Parliamentary Council drew a lesson from the Nazi era.

On 7 June 1951, American soldiers hanged seven Nazi war criminals at Landsberg Prison.

See also 
 Capital punishment in Germany
 List of most recent executions by jurisdiction

References

Bibliography

Sources 
 
 
 

1920 births
1949 deaths
20th-century executions by Germany
20th-century German criminals
German male criminals
German people convicted of murder
People convicted of murder by Germany
People executed for murder
People executed by Germany by guillotine
Luftwaffe personnel of World War II
German prisoners of war in World War II held by the United States